Peter Härtling (13 November 1933 – 10 July 2017) was a German writer, poet, publisher and journalist. He received the Order of Merit of the Federal Republic of Germany for his major contribution to German literature.

Biography
Härtling was born in Chemnitz, and spent the early part of his childhood living in Hartmannsdorf, Mittweida, where his father maintained a law firm. Following the outbreak of World War II, the family moved to the German-occupied town of Olomouc in Moravia. Like many of the town's German residents, Härtling's family fled before the Red Army's advance on the city during the final months of the war; the family briefly settled in Zwettl, Austria. Härtling's father was captured by the Russians, and died in June 1945 at the prisoner-of-war camp in Dollersheim. Following the conclusion of World War II, Härtling finally settled in Nürtingen, Baden-Württemberg. His mother committed suicide in October 1946. He studied under HAP Grieshaber at the Bernsteinschule art school, before starting work as a journalist.

Härtling had his first collection of poetry published in 1953. From 1967 to 1973, Härtling was the managing director of the German publishing house S. Fischer Verlag, located in Frankfurt. Härtling became a full-time writer after leaving S. Fischer Verlag. In the winter semester of 1983/84, he hosted the annual Frankfurter Poetik-Vorlesungen, a lecture series, in which a prominent writer discourses on topics pertaining to their work. Härtling used his lectureship to demonstrate the process of using a found object as the inspiration for a literary work. During the series of lectures, he wrote Der spanische Soldat, a short story based on a photograph by Robert Capa.

Härtling worked as the editor of the magazine Der Monat, and as the president of the Hölderlin society. In 1973 he moved to Mörfelden-Walldorf where he lived until his death on 10 July 2017.

Literary themes
Härtling devoted a large proportion of his literary output – both in poetry, and in prose – to the reclamation of history, and his own past. His autobiographical novel, Zwettl (1973), deals with the period he spent living in Lower Austria, after his family fled from the Red Army. Nachgetragene Liebe (1980) recounts Härtling's earliest memories of his deceased father.

Another major influence on Härtling's works has been the literature and music of Romanticism. Amongst other works, Härtling has written fictionalised biographical works on the writers Friedrich Hölderlin, Wilhelm Waiblinger and E. T. A. Hoffmann, and the composers Franz Schubert, and Robert Schumann.

Children's literature
In 1969, after writing a eulogy for the Czech children's writer Jan Procházka, Härtling began writing books for children. His first children's book, Und das ist die ganze Familie, was published the following year. His children's literature has often focused on social problems involving children. In Das war der Hirbel (1973), he wrote about the home of a maladjusted child, and Oma (1975) talks about aging and death, whilst Theo haut ab (1977) deals with being uprooted from home and family. There are English translations of several of his children's books, including Granny (Oma), Crutches (Krücke), Ben Loves Anna (Ben liebt Anna), Old John (Alter John), and Herbie's World (Das war der Hirbel).

Radio
Härtling moderated Literatur im Kreuzverhör, a radio show on the cultural radio station of Hessischer Rundfunk.

Awards 
Peter Härtling's awards include:
 1964: Deutscher Kritikerpreis for Niembsch
 1965: Lower Saxony Literature Prize for Niembsch
 1966: Ehrengabe des Kulturkreises im Bundesverband der Deutschen Industrie for Niembsch. Prix du Meilleur Livre Étranger for the French edition of Niembsch
 1971: Gerhart Hauptmann prize of the Freien Volksbühne Berlin for Gilles
 1974: Schubart-Literaturpreis
 1976: Deutscher Jugendliteraturpreis (Children's book) for Oma.
 1977: Stadtschreiber von Bergen
 1978: Wilhelmine-Lübke-Preis
 1980: Zurich children's literature prize La vache qui lit for Ben liebt Anna and Sofie macht Geschichten.
 1982: Naturschutzpreis der Kreisgruppe Groß-Gerau des Bundes für Umwelt und Naturschutz.
 1987: Hermann Sinsheimer prize and Friedrich Hölderlin prize
 1992: Lion Feuchtwanger prize.
 1994: Awarded the title of Professor by the state of Baden-Württemberg
 1995: Awarded the Großes Bundesverdienstkreuz
 1995: Mainzer Stadtschreiber
 1996: Awarded the Wilhelm Leuschner medal of Hessen
 1996: Awarded the Karl Preusker Medal by the German Literature Conference
 2000: Eichendorff Literature Prize
 2001: Deutscher Jugendliteraturpreis (Special prize) for his major contribution to children's literature
 2001: Dresdner Poetikdozentur zur Literatur Mitteleuropas (Publikation )
 2003: Deutscher Bücherpreis for his contribution to literature
 2004: Honorary citizen of Nürtingen
 2006: Gerty Spies Literature Prize
 2006: Finalist, Hans Christian Andersen Award 
 2007: Corine Literature Prize of the Bavarian Prime Minister for his contribution to literature
 2010: Jacob Grimm Prize
 2014: Hessischer Kulturpreis

Music 
Wilhelm Killmayer set nine of his poems in his song cycle  in 1968.

References

Further reading
 Burckhard Dücker, Peter Härtling, München: Beck: Verlag Edition Text und Kritik, 1983,  
 Maciej Ganczar, Romantische Künstlerfiguren in der Prosa von Peter Härtling, Frankfurt am Main: Peter Lang, 2015,  
 Ludvík Václavek: Peter Härtling und Olmütz. In: Lucy Topoľská und Ludvík Václavek: Beiträge zur Deutschsprachigen Literatur in Tschechien. (= Beiträge zur mährischen deutschsprachigen Literatur. Band 3). Univerzita Palackého, Olomouc 2000, S. 211-214.

External links
 
 

1933 births
2017 deaths
People from Chemnitz
20th-century German novelists
21st-century German novelists
Commanders Crosses of the Order of Merit of the Federal Republic of Germany
Recipients of the Order of Merit of Baden-Württemberg
German children's writers
German poets
German male short story writers
German short story writers
German essayists
German male poets
German male novelists
German-language poets
Members of the Academy of Arts, Berlin
German male essayists
Writers from Saxony
20th-century German short story writers
21st-century short story writers
20th-century essayists
21st-century essayists
20th-century German male writers
21st-century German male writers